Radio Killa Records is an American record label created by singer-songwriter/producer The-Dream. The label operates as an imprint of, and is distributed through, Def Jam Recordings. The-Dream is the CEO of the label, responsible for choosing all the singles released by its artists.

Background
The-Dream signed a deal with Def Jam Recordings in 2007, following the success of Rihanna's 2007 hit "Umbrella", which he wrote and produced with production partner Christopher "Tricky" Stewart. That year, he also completed his debut studio album Love Hate, which was the debut release of the label. The-Dream has since released his second studio album, Love vs. Money, with his third, Love King,  released in June 2010.

In 2008, the then-Executive Vice President of Def Jam Recordings Shakir Stewart, organized a meeting for Electrik Red with The-Dream and Tricky Stewart, who cosigned Electrik Red to Radio Killa. The-Dream and Stewart then became the group's executive producers for their debut album How to Be a Lady: Volume 1, which was released on May 26, 2009.

In an arrangement with chairman and CEO of Interscope Records, Jimmy Iovine, The-Dream was allowed to choose several artists to work with from the label's roster. The-Dream chose to work with Christina Milian on her fourth studio album Elope, among others. They collaborated in early 2009 and soon after he signed Milian to Radio Killa Records. The-Dream said that when he was building his label, he chose to work with Milian because he believed she was a talented singer. He said "it was one of these things where [when] you try to grow an artist, you can either grow them from the ground or you can come in and say, 'This artist needs this, that's all.' And that part of me I have, which is what she didn't have."

Artists
The-Dream
Electrik Red

Producers
The-Dream

Los Da Mystro

Former artists
August Alsina
Christina Milian

Releases
The-Dream
Love Hate (2007)
Love vs. Money (2009)
Love King (2010)
1977 (2012)
IV Play (2013)
Ménage à Trois: Sextape Vol. 1, 2, 3 (2018)
Electrik Red
How to Be a Lady: Volume 1 (2009)
August Alsina
Downtown: Life Under the Gun (2013)

References

External links
Official site

American record labels
Def Jam Recordings
Record labels established in 2007
2007 establishments in New York (state)
Contemporary R&B record labels